Edward Scott Sr. (October 17, 1917 – January 11, 2010) was an American baseball scout. Before he became the first African-American scout in the history of the Boston Red Sox of Major League Baseball, Scott was a talent-spotter for the Negro leagues, and he signed Henry Aaron, the Baseball Hall of Famer and future home run king, to Aaron's first professional contract for the Indianapolis Clowns.

Early life 

Scott was born in Dade City, Florida, but moved to Mobile, Alabama, as a young man, where he played baseball for a local, semi-professional African-American team, the Mobile Black Shippers. He worked in a paper company and barnstormed the area with his baseball team. When his playing days ended, he started scouting. But the 16 Major League teams were slow to integrate and the Negro Leagues were still operating when Scott's scouting career began.

Hank Aaron signing 

According to Ed Scott Jr., his father discovered the teenaged Aaron playing in a Mobile softball game. "If that boy can hit a softball that far, how far can he hit a baseball?" his son quoted Ed Sr. as saying. Aaron would go on to play 23 big-league seasons, and shatter (in ) Babe Ruth's all-time record with 755 home runs over his career. (Aaron currently stands second, all time, to Barry Bonds.)

Red Sox signings 

Scott spent four decades with the Red Sox as a scout, beginning in the early 1960s. Among the players he signed for Boston were George Scott (no relation), Oil Can Boyd and Amos Otis, who was drafted out of the Boston system as a minor-league prospect by the New York Mets. His son Alex also was a Boston area scout based in Mobile during the 1990s.

Personal life and death 

Also an accomplished golfer, Scott was inducted into the Mobile Sports Hall of Fame in 2003. He died in Mobile at age 92 on January 11, 2010.

References

External links
Ed Scott profile by Negro Leagues Baseball Museum
Obituary, from the Mobile Press-Register, January 14, 2010

1917 births
2010 deaths
Boston Red Sox scouts
Major League Baseball scouts
Negro league baseball players
Sportspeople from Mobile, Alabama
20th-century African-American sportspeople
21st-century African-American people